Huron is a Canadian rock band from Hamilton, Ontario. Members include pedal-steel player/guitarist Aaron Goldstein, known for his session work with Cowboy Junkies, and Cam Malcolm, who was previously in the band Sweet Homewreckers, bassist Adam Melnick, and drummer Pete Hall who was also a founding member of A Northern Chorus.

History
Huron was formed in January 2008 in Hamilton.  The band worked with record producer Ian Blurton for their debut album, which was released on Latent Recordings in March 2010.  The album received positive reviews from Exclaim magazine and Metro News.

Huron was also the backup band for Blurton's solo album Happy Endings, They  performed with him at live shows to promote the album, including participation in Canada Music Week.

Members 
 Cam Malcolm – guitar, vocals
 Aaron Goldstein – guitar, vocals, pedal steel guitar
 Adam Melnick – bass guitar, organ, vocals
 Peter Hall – drums, vocals

Discography 
 2010 – Huron
 2010 – Happy Endings (Ian Blurton)

References

External links
 Huron on Discogs.com
 Huron on Myspace
 Huron on CBC Radio 3

Musical groups established in 2008
Musical groups from Hamilton, Ontario
Canadian indie rock groups
2008 establishments in Ontario